Sebastián Héctor Sciorilli (born February 5, 1989 in Buenos Aires) is a retired Argentine footballer.

Club career
Sciorilli made his debut as an 18-year-old on 8 April 2007 with River Plate against Belgrano. He would eventually appear in four games during the 2006–2007 season.

In 2008, he was part of the squad that won the Clausura tournament, but he only featured in one of the games.

In 2008, he was loaned to Colón de Santa Fe and in 2009 he joined newly promoted Chacarita Juniors on loan.

On 29 December 2011, it was announced Sciorilli would move to Brazilian Série B outfit América Mineiro on loan for a one year with option to purchase 50 percent of their economic rights at the end of this 2012.

On 17 August 2012 Sciorilli signed with CSKA Sofia two years contract. He made his debut in 0–0 away draw against Cherno More in A PFG.

Coaching career
In October 2020, Sciorilli announced his retirement. At the end of December 2021, Sciorilli was appointed assistant coach of Germán Cavalieri at Club Comunicaciones.

References

External links
 
 Argentine Primera statistics in Spanish  

1989 births
Living people
Footballers from Buenos Aires
Argentine footballers
Argentine expatriate footballers
Argentine Primera División players
Primera Nacional players
Primera B Metropolitana players
Torneo Federal A players
First Professional Football League (Bulgaria) players
Primera B de Chile players
Campeonato Brasileiro Série B players
Club Atlético River Plate footballers
Club Atlético Colón footballers
Chacarita Juniors footballers
América Futebol Clube (MG) players
PFC CSKA Sofia players
Rangers de Talca footballers
Independiente Rivadavia footballers
Club Atlético Atlanta footballers
Club Almirante Brown footballers
Sol de América de Formosa players
Chaco For Ever footballers
Asociación Social y Deportiva Justo José de Urquiza players
San Martín de Burzaco footballers
Expatriate footballers in Brazil
Expatriate footballers in Bulgaria
Expatriate footballers in Chile
Argentine expatriate sportspeople in Brazil
Argentine expatriate sportspeople in Bulgaria
Argentine expatriate sportspeople in Chile
Association football midfielders